Ray Ellis (July 28, 1923 – October 27, 2008) was an American record producer, arranger, conductor, and saxophonist. He was responsible for the orchestration in Billie Holiday's Lady in Satin (1958).

Biography
Raymond Spencer Ellis was born in Philadelphia. He arranged many hit records in the 1950s and 1960s. Included are classics such as "A Certain Smile" and "Wild is the Wind" by Johnny Mathis, "Broken Hearted Melody" by Sarah Vaughan, and "Standing on the Corner" by the Four Lads. In 1970, he produced Emmylou Harris' debut LP Gliding Bird.

Ellis' work encompassed all areas of music, from records to film, commercials, and television. In the early 1960s, Ellis had a contract to produce his own easy listening record albums with RCA Victor, MGM, and Columbia, the most popular probably being Ellis in Wonderland. His television credits include theme music  for NBC News At Sunrise with Connie Chung and the background and incidental music for the first season of the original Spider-Man cartoons.

NBC News Today
Ellis also composed two extended themes for The Today Show, the first in 1971. It was used as the Friday closing theme (and eventually the show's full-time theme) until the end of the decade.  However, in Herald Square Music v. Living Music, the District Court of the Southern District of New York "found the instrumental arrangement and harmonization of defendant's melody to be substantially similar to that of 'Day by Day,'" a Stephen Schwartz song from the musical Godspell. As a result, Ellis composed a second Today Show theme based on the trademark NBC chimes. That theme was the NBC show's signature from 1978 to 1985 and has appeared irregularly on the morning program ever since.

Work with Filmation
Using the name of his wife "Yvette Blais" as a pseudonym, Ellis and Norm Prescott, who used the pseudonym "Jeff Michael" after his sons Jeff and Michael) composed nearly all of the background music for cartoon studio Filmation from 1968 to 1982, according to DVD booklets for Ark II, Space Academy, and Jason of Star Command.  Before adopting the pseudonym Yvette Blais, Ellis used "Spencer Raymond" on 1968's Fantastic Voyage, "George Blais" on some of Filmation's early '70s output and its feature films, and the name of his teenaged son Marc Ellis on 1969's The Hardy Boys. (Marc would later become a composer, assisting his father without credit on Filmation scores receiving credit for co-composing the theme to the 1979 Flash Gordon cartoon.) On 1978's Fabulous Funnies, Ellis was credited as "Mark Jeffrey" (opposite Lou Scheimer under the pseudonym "David Jeffrey", which he occasionally used in the 1970s). However, Ray Ellis was credited with his real name for background music to The Archie Show and Sabrina the Teenage Witch, as well as Star Trek: The Animated Series in the early 1970s.

Game-show music
Ellis, who resided in Los Angeles, also composed the music for the 1980s US edition of Sale of the Century theme, along with Hot Streak, Scrabble, Scattergories and Time Machine with his son Marc Ellis, that includes the Jack Grimsley's score from 1980 and the famed Reg Grundy Productions fanfare at the end of each broadcast; he also composed the theme from the short-lived US version of Catch Phrase.

Death
Ellis died of complications from melanoma on October 27, 2008, at an assisted-living facility in Encino, California. He was survived by sons Marc and Jeffrey.

Selected discography

As arranger or conductor
 Mood Jazz, Joe Castro (1956)
 Lady in Satin, Billie Holiday (1958)
 Chris Connor Sings the George Gershwin Almanac of Song, Chris Connor (1961)
 The Third Album, Barbra Streisand (1963)
 Soul, Lena Horne (1966)
 There Is a Time, Liza Minnelli (1966)
 And I Love Him!, Esther Phillips (1965)
 Seven Letters, Ben E. King (1965)
 Herbie Mann Plays The Roar of the Greasepaint – The Smell of the Crowd, Herbie Mann (1965)
 A Lazy Afternoon, Harold Land (1995)
 The Christmas Album, Johnny Mathis (2002)

References

External links
 
 Ray Ellis Interview NAMM Oral History Library (1997)

1923 births
2008 deaths
American jazz composers
American male jazz composers
American jazz musicians
American music arrangers
Record producers from Pennsylvania
Musicians from Philadelphia
MGM Records artists
Filmation people
RCA Victor artists
20th-century jazz composers
Deaths from melanoma
Deaths from cancer in California
American male conductors (music)
20th-century American composers
Jazz musicians from Pennsylvania
20th-century American conductors (music)
20th-century American male musicians